"What Animated Women Want" is the seventeenth episode of the twenty-fourth season of the American animated television series The Simpsons, and the 525th episode overall. It first aired on the Fox network in the United States on April 14, 2013.  The name is a take on that of the film What Women Want.

Plot
Homer and Marge have a lunch date at an up-market sushi restaurant. Marge is excited at the opportunity to have 'grown up people' conversations as the kids are not with them, but Homer is only interested in eating. Enraged, Marge storms out of the restaurant.  A worried Homer tries to fix his problems with Marge by finishing a to-do list from within his wallet that Marge had given him. Marge is disappointed because the list is from 6 years earlier.  Homer returns to the Japanese restaurant and is given relationship advice by the head chef. Homer takes some food from the restaurant back home and offers it to Marge.  She is almost impressed but becomes unhappy when Homer eats the food himself. Unsure of what to do, Homer goes to Moe's Tavern and talks to Moe about his marriage problems. Moe suggests winning her back by exciting her with sex, specifically sadomasochistic sex, as used in Fifty Shades of Grey. Homer goes to the local sex shop where he purchases an array of different sex devices. When he shows Marge all that he has bought she is confused and unimpressed. Homer sits down on one of the machines by mistake and is injured by it. He is taken to the hospital and while he is being treated they reconcile. Afterwards they return home and set all the sex items on fire; Marge admits that she was too hard on him as she says that no matter what he will try to make things right.

Meanwhile, Milhouse is sitting with Bart in the Springfield Elementary School cafeteria. He looks at Lisa and hopes that she will come up to him. She begins to approach him and he becomes excited, but she has only come to the table to tell Bart that Marge had mixed up their lunches. She asks Milhouse if she can eat his cupcake.  Having just seen A Streetcar Named Desire for a class assignment, Milhouse takes on the personality of Marlon Brando, and is rude and dismissive towards her, refusing her request for the cupcake. This causes him to win Lisa's respect. Confused as to why his new tactic works, he continues this to keep Lisa interested in him. Seeking answers as to if it is okay to pretend to be someone he is not, he approaches the school counselor (Wanda Sykes). Before she can give him an answer she receives a call notifying her she has been fired. Shocked, she tells Milhouse that he should continue pretending to be who he is not, because his regular personality is boring. Feeling as though he is betraying his character he throws cupcakes (the same from earlier on in the episode) at Lisa's window. He apologizes for pretending to be someone he is not and they feel happier.

Reception

Ratings
The episode received a 1.8 in the 18–49 demographic and was watched by a total of 4.11 million viewers. This made it the third most watched show on Fox's Animation Domination line up that night, beating The Cleveland Show and Bob's Burgers but losing to both American Dad! with 4.23 million and Family Guy with 5.02 million.

Critical reception
The episode received mixed reviews from critics. Robert David Sullivan of The A.V. Club gave the episode a C+, saying "This is a scattershot episode with a lot of pop-culture references but little comic momentum." Teresa Lopez of TV Fanatic gave the episode three and a half stars out of five, saying "Despite the hilarious sight gags and funny The Simpsons''' quotes, I felt humor of the episode was undercut by the odd narration. It seemed unnecessary as framing device as it didn't really add anything to the story." Rob H. Dawson of TV Equals said "The sushi restaurant portion of “What Animated Women Want” felt lazy too, mixing together Asian stereotypes and some vague notion of rude fancy restaurants into a less-than-hilarious mess, the only highlight being the alternate universe in which anime pieces of sushi go on an adventure in Santa's Little Helper’s intestines, which I actually liked, one piece of something fun in the middle of an otherwise lackluster The Simpsons''."

References

External links 
 
 "What Animated Women Want" at theSimpsons.com

The Simpsons (season 24) episodes
2013 American television episodes
Breaking Bad